Grethe Tønnesen is a Norwegian handball player. She played 60 matches for the Norway women's national handball team between 1968 and 1977.  She participated at the 1973 World Women's Handball Championship, where the Norwegian team placed 8th.

References

Year of birth missing (living people)
Possibly living people
Norwegian female handball players